is a Japanese politician of the Liberal Democratic Party, a member of the House of Councillors in the Diet (national legislature).

Overview 
A native of Hiroshima, Hiroshima and graduate of the University of Tokyo, he became mayor of Mihara, Hiroshima in 1987 and was elected to the House of Councillors for the first time in 1993.

References

External links 
  in Japanese.

Members of the House of Councillors (Japan)
1942 births
Hibakusha
Living people
People from Hiroshima
Liberal Democratic Party (Japan) politicians
University of Tokyo alumni